Village Hotels operates 33 hotels in the United Kingdom. The company was founded in 1995, and is now owned by Denver-based private equity firm KSL Capital Partners.

History
In March 2014, Village Urban Resorts was acquired from De Vere Group by KSL Capital Partners for £435 million as part of the group disposal with sale proceedings being used to payback debts of over £1.75 billion.

Following the reopening of all Hotels after the Coronavirus Pandemic in May 2021, the decision was made that all Village Spas would remain permanently closed. Most Spas have been removed and the space now being accommodated by additions to the Leisure Club

In Late 2021 the final stages were completed for the removal of the American themed Italian Restaurant - Buca Di Beppo

Hotels
Village hotels are mainly located on the outskirts of large towns and cities within England, Wales and Scotland. Hotels are mid-sized and operate as lifestyle mid market to upscale properties. Each hotel typically has between 110 and 160 rooms, a Pub & Grill, a Starbucks, meeting & conference rooms (branded as MeetMe Business Hub) and VWorks (new addition to hire smaller meeting rooms by the hour or a monthly membership to use facilities within VWorks)
The Village Hotel Blackpool has an 18-hole golf course and an outdoor heated swimming pool.

The chain has 33 hotels which they split into two categories based on the hotel style; Legacy and Black Box hotels. Village currently operates 21 "legacy" hotels and 12 "black box style" hotels.

Locations 
Scotland 
 Aberdeen
 Edinburgh
 Glasgow

North East & Yorkshire 
 Hull
 Leeds North
 Leeds South (Capitol Park)
 Newcastle (Cobalt Park)

North West

 Blackpool
 Liverpool
 Manchester Ashton
 Manchester Bury
 Manchester Cheadle
 Manchester Hyde
 Warrington
 Wirral

Midlands & East
 Birmingham Dudley
 Birmingham Walsall
 Coventry
 Nottingham
 Solihull

Wales
 Cardiff
 Chester St David’s
 Swansea

South
 Basingstoke
 Bournemouth
 Bracknell
 Bristol
 Farnborough
 London Watford
 Maidstone
 Portsmouth
 Southampton Eastleigh
 Swindon

References 

Hotel chains in the United Kingdom
British companies established in 1995
Hotels established in 1995
Companies based in Warrington